Boitumelo Maxwell Babuseng is a South African advocate and retired politician. He is the current chairperson of the National Bar Council of South Africa in the Northern Cape. Babuseng served as a Member of the Northern Cape Provincial Legislature for the Democratic Alliance (DA) from May 2014 until November 2019.

Babuseng retired from politics in October 2019. His last day in the legislature was on 30 November 2019. He has since returned to the Bar.

References

External links
Boitumelo Maxwell Babuseng

Living people
People from the Northern Cape
Members of the Northern Cape Provincial Legislature
21st-century South African lawyers
21st-century South African politicians
Democratic Alliance (South Africa) politicians
Year of birth missing (living people)